Paul Hart (born 1961) is a British landscape photographer. His work “explores our relationship with the landscape, in both a humanistic and socio-historical sense”. His books include Truncated (2009), Farmed (2016), Drained (2018) and Reclaimed (2020), all published by Dewi Lewis. In 2018 he was awarded the inaugural Wolf Suschitzky Photography Prize (UK) by the Austrian Cultural Forum, London.

Life and work
Hart studied art and design at Lincoln College of Art in 1984 and graduated from Trent Polytechnic with a BA Hons in Photography in 1988. He currently lives in Lincolnshire, England. He works solely with the black and white analogue process, using large format and medium format film cameras, processing and printing all work in his own darkroom. Between 2005 and 2008 Hart produced a series of photographs which explored the pine forest plantations of the Ladybower Reservoir in the Peak District National Park, resulting in the series and book Truncated. In 2009 he began photographing the landscape of East Anglia and made a series of photographs in The Fens. This initiated a ten-year project which resulted in a three-part series on the region: Farmed (2009–15), Drained (2016–17) and Reclaimed (2018–19).

Publications

Publications by Hart
 Truncated. Stockport: Dewi Lewis, 2009. . With an introduction by Gerry Badger. 
 Farmed. Stockport: Dewi Lewis, 2016. . With an introduction by Collier Brown. First edition, 2016; second edition, 2018.
 Drained. Stockport: Dewi Lewis, 2018. . With an introduction by Francis Hodgson. First edition, 2018; second edition, 2020.
 Reclaimed. Stockport: Dewi Lewis, 2020. . With an introduction by Isabelle Bonnet in French and with English translation.

Publications with contributions by Hart
 Chris Dickie. Photo Projects: Plan and Publish Your Photography – In Print and on the Internet. London: Argentum, 2006. .
 Brooks Jensen. Looking at Images: A Deeper Look at Selected Photographs Published in LensWork and LensWork Extended. Anacortes, WA: LensWork, 2014.  .
 Martin Barnes. Into the Woods: Trees in Photography. London: Victoria and Albert Museum/Thames & Hudson, 2019. .
 Gerry Badger. Another Country: British Documentary Photography since 1945. London: Thames & Hudson; Bristol: Martin Parr Foundation, 2022. .

Exhibitions

Solo exhibitions
 Poetry of Place, Print Sales Gallery, The Photographers' Gallery, London, 2018
Print Sales Gallery, The Photographers' Gallery, London, 2019
 Edgelands, Fen Ditton Gallery, Cambridge, UK, 2020

Group exhibitions
 Royal Academy of Arts, Summer Exhibition, London, 2012
 Royal Academy of Arts, Summer Exhibition, London, 2018
 Austrian Cultural Forum, London, Wolf Suschitzky Photography Prize, 2019
 Royal Academy of Arts, Summer Exhibition, London, 2019

Awards
 2018/19: Wolf Suschitzky Photo Prize, Austrian Cultural Forum, London and Vienna. UK Winner for Farmed and Drained.

Collections
 Victoria and Albert Museum: 1 print (as of October 2020)

References

External links

Alumni of Nottingham Trent University
21st-century British photographers
Landscape photographers
1961 births
Living people